Miss Esmeralda is a Victorian burlesque, in two acts, with music by Meyer Lutz and Robert Martin and a libretto by Fred Leslie, under his pseudonym "A. C. Torr", and Horace Mills.  It is based on Victor Hugo's Notre Dame de Paris.

The piece premiered in 1887 at the Gaiety Theatre in London, starring Marion Hood in the title role, with Frank Thornton as Quasimodo and featuring E. J. Lonnen and Letty Lind.

Background and production
John Hollingshead had managed the Gaiety Theatre from 1868 to 1886 as a venue for variety, continental operetta, light comedy, and musical burlesques.  In 1886, Hollingshead ceded the management of the theatre to George Edwardes, whom he had hired in 1885.  Fred Leslie wrote many of the theatre's pieces under his pseudonym, "A. C. Torr". Beginning with Little Jack Sheppard (1885), Edwardes expanded the format of the burlesques to full-length pieces with original music by Meyer Lutz, instead of scores compiled from popular tunes.  These included Monte Cristo Jr. (1886); Frankenstein, or The Vampire's Victim (1887), Mazeppa, Faust up to Date (1888), Ruy Blas and the Blasé Roué (1888), Carmen up to Data (1890), Cinder Ellen up too Late (1891) and Don Juan (1892, with lyrics by Adrian Ross). In the early 1890s, as burlesque went out of fashion, Edwardes changed the focus of the theatre from musical burlesque to the new genre of Edwardian musical comedy.

Miss Esmeralda premiered on 8 October 1887 at the Gaiety, starring Marion Hood in the title role, with Frank Thornton as Quasimodo and featuring comedy star E. J. Lonnen and dancer Letty Lind. Percy Anderson designed the costumes.  Fred Leslie and the theatre's leading actress, Nellie Farren, were away on tour.  When they returned, the piece closed in December to make way for a new piece starring Leslie and Farren, Frankenstein, or The Vampire's Victim, which opened on 24 December 1887.

Plot
Act I
The gipsy Esmeralda is in love with the dashing young Captain Phoebus, who is, unfortunately, engaged to the fierce Fleur-de-Lis.  Esmeralda has inadvertently also captivated a monk, Claude Frollo, and the hunchback Quasimodo.  Frollo vengefully stabs Corporal Gringoire and tries to frame Esmeralda with the crime; she is arrested.

Act II
Quasimodo visits Esmeralda in prison and vows to help her, assuring her that he can establish her innocence.  Frollo says that he will liberate her if she agrees to marry him.  At her trial, Frollo is the prosecutor, and Phoebus is counsel for the defence.  Esmeralda's innocence is proved the apparition of Gringoire, which is produced by Quasimodo.

Roles and original cast
Clopin – Leo Stormont
Claude Frollo – E. J. Lonnen
Quasimodo – Frank Thornton
Corporal Gringoire – George Stone
Belvigne – E. W. Colman
Captain Phoebus – Fannie Leslie
Ernest – Ada Blanche
Esmeralda – Marion Hood
Madame Gondelarieur – Emily Miller
Fleur-de-Lis – Letty Lind
Zillah – Addie Blanche
Female Warders – Maud Richardson and Marie de Braham

Musical numbers
Only a Gypsy Girl – Esmeralda
His for evermore – Esmeralda
The Noble Born – Clopin
Killaloe – Frollo
Convicts – Chorus

Notes

References
Hollingshead, John.  Good Old Gaiety: An Historiette & Remembrance (1903)  London: Gaiety Theatre Co

External links
Vocal score
Review of a New Zealand production

Musicals by Meyer Lutz
1887 musicals